Janolus toyamensis, common name purple-tipped janolus, is a colorful sea slug, an arminina (a suborder of Janolus) nudibranch, a marine gastropod mollusc in the family Proctonotidae.

References

External links
 

Proctonotidae
Gastropods described in 1970